The Marble Hills are a group of mainly ice-free hills in West Antarctica. They are located on the west side of Horseshoe Valley, between the Liberty Hills and Independence Hills in the southern part of the Heritage Range, Ellsworth Mountains. The hills were named by the University of Minnesota Ellsworth Mountains Party, 1962–63, because the rocks in these hills are composed of marble.

Features
Geographical features include:

 Beitzel Peak
 Craddock Crags
 Minaret Peak
 Mount Fordell

References

Hills of Ellsworth Land